This is a list of properties and districts in Bryan County, Georgia that are listed on the National Register of Historic Places (NRHP).

Current listings

|}

References

Bryan
Bryan County, Georgia
National Register of Historic Places in Bryan County, Georgia